Forestdale Christian School is a Seventh-day Adventist school located in Bryant Pond, Maine.  Educating grades K–10, it is located off Perkins Valley Road at the foot of Mollyockett Mountain connected to the Woodstock SDA  on a plot of rural land.

External links 
 

Schools in Oxford County, Maine
Private elementary schools in Maine
Private middle schools in Maine